Jovica Arsić (November 3, 1968) is a Serbian professional basketball coach.

Coaching career 
On April 9, 2018, Arsić was named as the head coach for Borac Čačak. Borac parted ways with him in June 2019. On June 17, 2019, Arsić was named as the head coach for Balkan Botevgrad of the Bulgarian NBL.

References 

Living people
1968 births
KK Borac Čačak coaches
KK Lavovi 063 coaches
KK Vojvodina Srbijagas coaches
KK Zdravlje coaches
Serbian men's basketball coaches
Serbian expatriate basketball people in Bulgaria
Serbian expatriate basketball people in Romania
Serbian expatriate basketball people in North Macedonia
Serbian expatriate basketball people in Ukraine
Sportspeople from Leskovac